Group C of the 1991 FIFA Women's World Cup took place from 17 to 21 November 1991. The group consisted of Chinese Taipei, Germany, Italy and Nigeria.

Standings

Matches
All times listed are local, CST (UTC+8).

Germany vs Nigeria

Chinese Taipei vs Italy

Italy vs Nigeria

Chinese Taipei vs Germany

Chinese Taipei vs Nigeria

Italy vs Germany

References

External links
FIFA Women's World Cup China PR 1991, FIFA.com

1991 FIFA Women's World Cup
Chinese Taipei at the 1991 FIFA Women's World Cup
Germany at the 1991 FIFA Women's World Cup
Italy at the 1991 FIFA Women's World Cup
Nigeria at the 1991 FIFA Women's World Cup